The 2009–10 Savannah State Tigers basketball team competed in American basketball on behalf of Savannah State University. The Tigers competed in the NCAA Division I as an independent and finished the season 11–15.   The team played its home games at Tiger Arena in Savannah, Georgia.  The Tigers entered the season seeking to improve on the 15–14 record posted in the 2008–09 season, the team's first winning season in 23 years. The fifteen victories were the most since the university moved to Division I in 2002.

Coaching staff

Roster

Player stats
Stats current as of

Schedule

Awards and records

Awards
 Sophomore forward Rashad Hassan was named to the 2010 All-Independent Men's Basketball Team.

References

Savannah State Tigers
Savannah State Tigers basketball seasons
Savannah State Tigers basketball team
Savannah State Tigers basketball team